Hawick News is a tabloid newspaper that covers the area of Hawick, one of the larger towns in the Scottish Borders. It includes local news, politics, and sport.  It is part of Johnston Press subsidiary Tweeddale Press Group. Contributors to the newspaper include regular sports columnist Thomas Clark, rugby correspondent Alexander McLeman,

Sports reporter John Florence received the unsung hero award at the 2008 James McLean Trust (JMT) Awards.

References

External links 
 

Newspapers published in Scotland
Scottish Borders
Hawick